is a Japanese football player.

Club statistics
Updated to 23 February 2019.

References

External links
Profile at Giravanz Kitakyushu

1988 births
Living people
Ritsumeikan University alumni
Association football people from Kanagawa Prefecture
Japanese footballers
J2 League players
J3 League players
Kyoto Sanga FC players
Giravanz Kitakyushu players
Association football midfielders